The Foster Boy is a 2011 Swiss drama film directed by Markus Imboden. It dramatizes the fate of two Verdingkinder in Emmental.

Plot 
Max is an orphan whose one true passion is to play the accordion. He is sent to the Bosigers farm where he meets Berteli who is also with the Bosigers as a foster child just like him. Even though they are cared for by being fed and sent to school, Max and Berteli are treated like servants on the farm. Berteli is upset from being separated from her mother and at first Mrs Bosiger shows a tenderness towards her by giving her chocolate while she cries at the dinner table. Max is indifferent towards Berteli in the beginning but later on develops a genuine affection towards her. Max has a pet rabbit which he loves and Berteli innocently tells Jakob, the Bosigers son, about it, who cruelly kills the rabbit and brings the meat for Mrs Bosiger to cook. When he reveals at the table that it was Max's rabbit that he brought, Max rushes outside disgusted, and vomits repulsed over eating his own rabbit.

At school, Max and Berteli's teacher Miss. Sigrist, take a special interest in Max and encourages him to play his accordion for Wrestler's Day. The family enjoy the evening out on Wrestler's Day during which Jakob attempts to make sexual advances on Miss Sigrist, causing Max to intervene and beat up Jakob. Jakob takes his revenge on Max by burning his accordion. Life gets more unbearable for Berteli when Jakob now visits her room every night to rape her. Berteli tries to run away and return to her mother, who is unable to look after her but still begs the man she's living with to keep Berteli with her. He refuses and Berteli sensing her mother's dilemma, voluntarily leaves and says that she will go back to the Bosigers and that she came to see her because she was homesick. Unable to bear what is happening to them both, Max suggests that they should run away to Argentina where he can become a musician and earn a living. Miss Sigrist, tries to intervene and goes to the authorities to expose the abuse Max and Berteli are going through. Berteli becomes pregnant, and one day a horrified Max sees Jakob going to Berteli's room and confides in Miss Sigrist. Miss Sigrist visits the farm and tells Mrs. Bosiger that Jakob has been having sex with Berteli, upon which Mrs Bosiger becomes furious and throws her out. Miss Sigrist angrily tells Mrs Bosiger that it is her responsibility to care for these two children and not ignore what has been happening to Berteli. Miss Sigrist who has now lost her job because she tried to help Max and Berteli, leaves after giving Max a brand new accordion. Mrs. Bosiger sees Berteli vomiting and asks her why she is sick to which replies that it is because of what Jakob does to  her at night. Mrs. Bosiger gets angry and forces Berteli to admit that she is lying, but however, she does confront Jakob who doesn't admit or deny anything. Mrs. Bosiger makes Berteli to drink a bottle of castor oil as part of a home remedy abortion, and at night Berteli's screams are heard by Max as she starts aborting the baby. A heavily intoxicated Mr. Bosiger prevents Max from going to Berteli and forces him to play his accordion to hide her screams. Max visits Berteli after her contractions stop and Mrs. Bosiger is seen changing the blood stained sheets. The two plan to run away to Argentina as soon as Berteli becomes better, however she dies and it is unclear whether Berteli has committed suicide or succumbed to infection. The authorities investigate and Mrs Bosiger and Jakob claim that Berteli's death was of a suicide. When the Reverend starts to pray before taking Berteli's body away, Max comes shouting the truth behind Berteli's death. Mr. Bosiger shows the authorities the bottle of castor oil that Mrs Bosigner forced Berteli to drink. The authorities are now aware of the abuse foster children suffer and plan to investigate further. 

Max runs away to Argentina and gets onto a ship where he works and plays his accordion to make a living. Although he is sad about Berteli's passing he narrates as though he is speaking to her about how much he earns, his work, the food he gets to eat and about how he is no longer beaten at work. He says that he will continue to communicate with Berteli who is in heaven with her father and Max's rabbit through his music. The ending scene shows Max now an old man playing his accordion to an audience at his own concert indicating that he managed to reach Argentina and become the musician he always dreamed of becoming.

Cast 
 Katja Riemann - Bösigerin
 Stefan Kurt - Bösiger
 Max Simonischek - Jakob 
 Max Hubacher - Max
  - Berteli
 Miriam Stein - Esther
 Andreas Matti - Hasslinger
  - Grossmutter
 Ursina Lardi - Mutter Dürrer
  - Polizist
  - Störmetzger

References

External links 

2011 films
2011 drama films
Swiss drama films
Swiss German-language films
Films set in the 1950s
Films about orphans
Films about child abuse